Charles Manning (1894–1978) was a South African academic.

Charles Manning may also refer to:

 Charles Manning (rugby league), New Zealand rugby league player
 Charles Manning, style editor for Cosmopolitan magazine
 Charles Manning Child, American zoologist
 Charles Manning Reed, Whig member of the U.S. House of Representatives from Pennsylvania
 Charles Manning Reed Mansion, also known as the Erie Club, is a historic home/clubhouse located in Erie, Pennsylvania
 Charles Manning Hope Clark, Australian historian
 Charles Manning House, historic house in Reading, Massachusetts
 Charles H. Manning, photographer and associate of Townsend Duryea
 Charles Nelson Manning, former professional baseball relief pitcher
 Ernest Charles Manning, Canadian politician

See also
Manning (surname)